Habash may refer to:

People
Al-Habash, ancient region in the Horn of Africa
Habesha people, of Ethiopia and Eritrea
Siddi or Habshi, people of African descent in India and Pakistan
Habash al-Hasib al-Marwazi, a Persian astronomer
George Habash, a Palestinian political leader, ex-Secretary-General of the Popular Front for the Liberation of Palestine
Sakher Habash, a Palestinian leader of the Fatah movement
Mohammad Al-Habash, a Syrian Islamic scholar, writer and politician.

Places
Habash, Ardabil, Iran
Habash, East Azerbaijan, Iran
Habash-e Olya, West Azerbaijan Province, Iran
Habash-e Sofla, West Azerbaijan Province, Iran
Habash, Zanjan, Iran

See also 
Habishi (disambiguation)
Abyssinian (disambiguation)
Abyssinia (disambiguation)